Rudolf Fiket (born 5 February 1915– died 31 January 1978) was a Yugoslav racing cyclist. He rode in the 1936 Tour de France.

He died in 1978.

References

External links
 

1915 births
Year of death missing
Yugoslav male cyclists
Place of birth missing